Võivere is a village in Väike-Maarja Parish, Lääne-Viru County, in northeastern Estonia. It has a population of 49 (as of 1 January 2011).

One of the points of the Struve Geodetic Arc is located in Võivere.

References

Villages in Lääne-Viru County